Q36.5 Pro Cycling Team is a Swiss UCI ProTeam focusing on road bicycle racing. Douglas Ryder created the team which will ride its first season in 2023. The team is sponsored by clothing brand Q36.5.

History

Formation
After  folded in 2021, Douglas Ryder said he always wanted to come back to cycling at the top level. In 2022 Ryder was looking for riders to race for his team in 2022. The team was formed with riders who already rode for UCI WorldTeams plus some riders from the second and third divisions. Retired  professional Vincenzo Nibali joined as the team's technical advisor. In December 2022, Union Cycliste Internationale announced that Q36.5 Pro Cycling Team was granted a UCI ProTeam licence for 2023 season.

Team roster

Major wins
2023
Clásica de Almería, Matteo Moschetti
Stage 6 Tour du Rwanda, Matteo Badilatti
Sources:

References

External links

Cycling teams established in 2023
2023 establishments in Switzerland
UCI Professional Continental teams